Dysochrysa, the red lacewings, belong to the green lacewing family Chrysopidae. They are medium-sized Afrotropical lacewings with large eyes, and have brightly coloured bodies like the related genus Oviedus.

Species
The small genus contains at least two species,  including:
Dysochrysa furcata
Dysochrysa reflexa

References

Chrysopidae
Neuroptera genera
Insects of Africa